Miroslav Radić (born 10 September 1962) is a Serbian army officer who became prominent in the Battle of Vukovar, and was later prosecuted for alleged complicity in the Vukovar massacre, but was released after being acquitted by the ICTY.

During the Yugoslav wars, Radić served as a Captain in the Yugoslav People's Army (JNA), serving as the commander of the Special Infantry Unit, 1st Battalion, 1st Guards Motorised Brigade.

Thought to have participated in the subsequent Vukovar massacre, Radić was indicted in 1995, along with Mile Mrkšić, Veselin Šljivančanin and Slavko Dokmanović, by the International Criminal Tribunal for the Former Yugoslavia (ICTY). The indictment accused him of "responsibility for the mass killing at Ovčara, near Vukovar, of approximately 260 captive non-Serb men". Radić was formally charged with "crimes against humanity and war crimes including persecutions on political, racial, and religious grounds, extermination, murder, torture, inhuman acts and cruel treatment", and pleaded not guilty to all counts.

Radić turned himself in to the war crimes tribunal in 2002. He was acquitted on all counts on 27 September 2007, after it was determined that his soldiers had provided the initial security for Vukovar hospital during the massacre, but the cross-examination of three witnesses failed to produce evidence that Radić himself had knowledge of the massacre at Ovčara during the event.

References

Place of birth missing (living people)
Living people
Serbian soldiers
Officers of the Yugoslav People's Army
People extradited from Serbia
Military personnel of the Croatian War of Independence
1962 births